Jacob Ben-Arie (born 1950) is a former Israeli paralympic champion.

Ben-Arie was born in Kibbutz Na'an, grandson of Yerachmiel Tzimbal. Shortly after he was born the family moved to live in Kibbutz Gesher, where he was affected by polio in 1952. In 1960 the family moved Givatayim, where he began in 1962 to practice sports at the Israel Sports Center for the Disabled.

Between 1968 and 1976, Ben-Arie completed a degree in Biology at Tel Aviv University and studied for MA in Psychology and Biomechanics at New York University. Alongside his studies he continued to practice in swimming, wheelchair basketball and athletics. Throughout the years he took part in several Stoke Mandeville Games and Paralympic Games.

Beginning in 1978, Ben-Arie worked at "Telrad" telecommunications company. Promoted to the rank of deputy CEO, he retired in 1998. Appointed in 2002 as director of the Israel Sports Center for the Disabled, he held the position until 2011.

References 
 

Living people
1950 births
Paralympic athletes of Israel
Athletes (track and field) at the 1968 Summer Paralympics
Israeli male swimmers
Israeli men's wheelchair basketball players
Paralympic swimmers of Israel
Swimmers at the 1964 Summer Paralympics
Swimmers at the 1968 Summer Paralympics
Paralympic wheelchair basketball players of Israel
Wheelchair basketball players at the 1964 Summer Paralympics
Wheelchair basketball players at the 1968 Summer Paralympics
Wheelchair basketball players at the 1972 Summer Paralympics
Paralympic gold medalists for Israel
Paralympic silver medalists for Israel
Paralympic bronze medalists for Israel
People with paraplegia
Wheelchair category Paralympic competitors
Israeli male wheelchair racers
Paralympic wheelchair racers
Medalists at the 1964 Summer Paralympics
Medalists at the 1968 Summer Paralympics
Medalists at the 1972 Summer Paralympics
Paralympic medalists in wheelchair basketball
Paralympic medalists in swimming